Adolphe L'Arronge (8 March 1838 – 25 May 1908) was a German playwright and theatre director. His best known work is the 1873 comedy play My Leopold which has been adapted into numerous films.

Selected works
 My Leopold (1873)
 Hasemann's Daughters (1877)
 The Lonei Household (1880)

References

1838 births
1908 deaths
Writers from Hamburg